Wolfgang Condrus (né Wolfgang Breuer; born 1941) is a German film and television actor.

Selected filmography
 Turtledove General Delivery (1952)
 Mailman Mueller (1953)
 We'll Talk About Love Later (1953)
 Have Sunshine in Your Heart (1953)
 Emil and the Detectives (1954)
 My Leopold (1955)
 Charley's Aunt (1956)
 The Priest of St. Pauli (1970)
 Group Portrait with a Lady (1977)
 Mandara (1983, TV miniseries)

References

Bibliography
 Susan G. Figge & Jenifer K. Ward. Reworking the German Past: Adaptations in Film, the Arts, and Popular Culture. Camden House, 2010.

External links

1941 births
Living people
German male film actors
German male television actors
Male actors from Berlin